Brachycybe rosea is a species of millipede in the family Andrognathidae. It is found in North America.

References

Further reading

External links

 

Millipedes of North America
Articles created by Qbugbot
Animals described in 1877
Platydesmida